Hayes Gordon OBE, AO (February 25, 1920October 19, 1999) was an American actor, stage producer and director and acting teacher with a considerable career in Australia.

Early life 
Gordon was born in Boston, Massachusetts. He was mentored by Oscar Hammerstein, and appeared on Broadway in several musicals, including the original production of Oklahoma! (1943), Show Boat and Brigadoon.   He also appeared in America's first television soap opera Fashion Story.  He was named in a newsletter Red Networks, which specialised in naming alleged communists and sympathisers, and after he refused in 1951 to sign a loyalty oath declaring that he was not a communist, work dried up completely.<ref>Katrina Strickland, article An ideal life, in The Weekend Australian, 23–24 August 1997, p. 11.</ref>

Immigration to Australia and career
Gordon went to Australia in 1952 to star in the musical Kiss Me, Kate. He stayed in the country and established the Ensemble Theatre in North Sydney with a group of young students he tutored from the Independent Theatre. This was a co-operative style theatre and also Australia's first theatre-in-the-round. He also established Australia's longest surviving acting school, the Ensemble Studios, in the 1950s, which closed in 2009. Hayes was Principal of the school from its inception until his death. Toward the end of his life he published Acting and Performing which outlined his Stanislavsky-influenced acting methods. He passed on directorship of the Ensemble Theatre to Sandra Bates in 1986.

He played Tevye in the original Australian cast of Fiddler on the Roof from 1967 to 1970, and later in a 1985-86 revival for the Australian Opera. He also played 'Daddy' Warbucks in the original Australian cast of Annie'' which opened in 1978.

Gordon was a great friend and mentor to Australian actress Denise Roberts, who taught film and television at the Ensemble Studios for Hayes for over 6 years. In September 2000, Denise established Screenwise and began teaching the Hayes Gordon philosophy for screen acting.

Personal life
He had one daughter, Kati, who lived with her mother in the USA. He remarried in the early 1980s to Helen Terry and remained with her until his death.

Honours
He was appointed an Officer of the Order of the British Empire (OBE) in the New Year's Honours of 1979, and an Officer of the Order of Australia (AO) in the Australia Day Honours of 1997, for his contribution to the arts.

Death
He died in Sydney of heart disease, on 19 October 1999, aged 79.

References

External links

Ensemble Theatre website

American male musical theatre actors
American male stage actors
American male film actors
American emigrants to Australia
1920 births
1999 deaths
Drama teachers
20th-century American male actors
20th-century American singers
20th-century American male singers